The Code is an American military drama television series created by Craig Sweeny and Craig Turk. The military legal drama was ordered to series on May 11, 2018, by CBS. The series premiered on April 9, 2019. 
On July 23, 2019, CBS canceled the series after one season.

Premise 
The Code takes place as the "United States Military's brightest minds take on America's toughest challenges inside the courtroom and out, where each attorney is trained as a prosecutor, a defense lawyer, an investigator—and a Marine."

Cast
 Luke Mitchell as Captain John "Abe" Abraham, a third-generation Marine Infantry Officer who was wounded while serving in Afghanistan and became an attorney after being deemed medically unfit to serve in direct combat.  He is a member of Marine Corps Base Quantico's Trial Services (prosecutor's) Office.
 Anna Wood as Captain Maya Dobbins, an eight-year veteran Marine and member of the Defense Services Office at MCB Quantico.  She is from Winston-Salem, North Carolina, where her older brother Matt is running for election to the North Carolina State Senate.  When his mental health issues force him to drop out of the race, the national political party asked Maya to run in his place, which she declined as she felt she wasn't yet ready to leave the Corps for political office, although that remains her long-term goal.
 Ato Essandoh as Major Trey Ferry, originally Captain Abraham's immediate supervisor in the Trial Services Office until he became Senior Defense Counsel halfway through the season.  He and his wife, Nona, have struggled for years to conceive a child, undergoing IVF treatments.  In "Don and Doff", he and Nona learn they are having twins, but she miscarries shortly thereafter, leaving them heartbroken.
 Raffi Barsoumian as Warrant Officer Rami Ahmadi, MCB Quantico's invaluable Legal Administrative Officer with almost nine years of service.  A native of Dearborn, Michigan, Rami enlisted in the Marines as a path to become a United States citizen; on the eve of his citizenship test, Rami decided to protest the suspension of the MAVNI program, which caused him to be temporarily reassigned to the United States Marine Corps Training and Education Command until his friends convinced him to take the test lest he languish the rest of his career in a glorified rubber room.  In "Legit Bad Day", Rami officially becomes a US citizen.  He has been married for four years and has a daughter.
 Phillipa Soo as 1st Lieutenant Harper Li, a young Marine nine months out of Officer Candidate School, assigned to Captain Abraham as his second chair.  A native of San Francisco and a graduate of Stanford University and Stanford Law School, Harper comes from a family of litigators who view her joining the Marine Corps as "backpacking through Europe after law school".  While on a fact-finding mission overseas, Harper finds herself in combat for the first time alongside a group of MARSOC Raiders, during which she earns a Bronze Star with Combat "V" after taking command upon the death of the platoon commander.  In "Legit Bad Day", Harper leaves for SERE School for six weeks.
 Dana Delany as Colonel Glenn Turnbull, who oversees the attorneys and helps them navigate the politics surrounding the legal system.  Colonel Turnbull is married to a former Marine, now in the private sector, although they are separated; they share a son, Adam, who is a 24-year-old 1st Lieutenant.  In "Legit Bad Day", she mentions that she is a third-generation Marine and her grandfather was killed during the Battle of Belleau Wood during World War I.  In "Don and Doff", she learned that she was a candidate for promotion to Brigadier General.

Production

Development
On February 2, 2018, it was announced that CBS had given the production a pilot order. The pilot script was set to be written by Craig Sweeny who was also set as an executive producer along with Craig Turk, Carl Beverly and Sarah Timberman. Production companies involved with the pilot include CBS Television Studios and Timberman-Beverly Productions. On February 9, 2018, it was reported that Marc Webb would direct the pilot episode.

On May 11, 2018, it was announced that CBS had given the production a series order. A few days later, it was announced that the series would premiere in the spring of 2019 as a mid-season replacement. On January 15, 2019, it was announced that the series would be held back from mid-season with a premiere date of April 9, 2019. While the pilot aired on a Tuesday at 9 PM, all subsequent episodes aired weekly on Mondays during the 9 PM time slot. On July 23, 2019, CBS canceled the series after one season.

Casting
In the original pilot, Dave Annable and Mira Sorvino were cast as the series' male lead and a major co-starring role, respectively. When 'The Code' was picked up, Australian actor Luke Mitchell took over the role of Captain John "Abe" Abraham from Annable, while Dana Delany took over Sorvino's role as Colonel Glenn (originally named Eisa) Turnbull.

Episodes

Home media
The full complete series was released on DVD as for CBS Home Entertainment on June 30, 2020.

Reception

Critical response
On Rotten Tomatoes, the series holds an approval rating of 30% based on reviews from 10 critics, with an average rating of 6.5/10. The website's critical consensus reads, "Despite its pedigree, The Code does little to differentiate itself in a crowded field." On Metacritic, it has a weighted average score of 56 out of 100, based on reviews from five critics, indicating "mixed or average reviews".

Robert Lloyd of the Los Angeles Times called it "consistently diverting" and described it as : "like JAG but in the Marines with a pleasing hint of The Good Wife". Daniel D'Addario of Variety gave a mixed review and called the show deeply familiar, and said it made NCIS look great by comparison. Dan Fienberg of The Hollywood Reporter called it a "thoroughly average procedural" and compared the show unfavorably to the film A Few Good Men. Others criticized the show for technical inaccuracies.

Ratings

See also

 JAG (TV series)
 Uniform Code of Military Justice
 List of United States Marine Corps acronyms and expressions

References

External links

2010s American drama television series
2010s American legal television series
2019 American television series debuts
2019 American television series endings
American legal drama television series
American military television series
CBS original programming
English-language television shows
Military courtroom dramas
Television shows about the United States Marine Corps
Television series by CBS Studios
Television series about prosecutors